The Herberger Institute for Design and the Arts at Arizona State University in Tempe, Arizona was created in 2009 by the merger of two existing academic units, the Katherine K. Herberger College of the Arts and the College of Design. The Arizona Board of Regents approved the merger on April 30, 2009. The Herberger Institute comprises five schools: the School of Art; the School of Arts, Media and Engineering; The Design School; The New American Film School; and the School of Music, Dance and Theatre. It also houses the ASU Art Museum.

Units
 School of Art
 School of Arts, Media and Engineering
 The Design School
 The New American Film School School of Film, Dance and Theatre 
 School of Music, Dance and Theatre
 ASU Art Museum

Deans
 James Elmore, dean, College of Design, 1964
 Henry A. Bruinsma, dean, College of Fine Arts, 1964–1975
 William Arnold, acting dean, College of Fine Arts, 1975–1976
 Jules Heller, dean, College of Fine Arts, 1976–1985
 Walter Harris, acting dean, College of Fine Arts, 1985–1986
 Seymour L. Rosen, dean, College of Fine Arts, 1986–1994
 Robert Wills, dean, College of Fine Arts, 1994–2006
 Wellington "Duke" Reiter, dean, College of Design, 2003–2008
 Kwang-Wu Kim, dean, Herberger College of Fine Arts, 2006–2009; Herberger Institute for Design and the Arts 2009–2013
 Michael Underhill, interim dean, Herberger Institute for Design and the Arts, 2013–2014
 Steven J. Tepper, dean, Herberger Institute for Design and the Arts, 2014–present

Awards
In 2017, the National Endowment for the Arts (NEA) awarded $100,000 to Herberger Institute in partnership with Center for Performance and Civic Practice.

See also
 History of Arizona State University
 Cross-Cultural Dance Resources

References

Arizona State University
Educational institutions established in 1964
Art schools in Arizona
Education in Tempe, Arizona
Buildings and structures in Tempe, Arizona
Universities and colleges in Maricopa County, Arizona
Film schools in Arizona
Tourist attractions in Tempe, Arizona
1964 establishments in Arizona